Sergey Nikolayevich Bagayev is a Russian scientist, a specialist in the field of quantum electronics and laser physics, director of the Institute of Laser Physics (1992–2016).  His h-index is 16.

Biography
Sergey Bagayev was born on September 9, 1941 in Novosibirsk.

In 1964, he graduated from the Faculty of Physics of the Novosibirsk Electrotechnical Institute (NETI).

In 1991, the scientist, together with Veniamin Chebotayev, participated in the creation of the Institute of Laser Physics, and in 1992, he became its director.

He heads departments and teaches at Novosibirsk State University, Novosibirsk State Technical University and Moscow Institute of Physics and Technology.

Scientific activity

Bagayev discovered new qualitative features of the absorption of laser radiation by a gas at low pressure.

Physicist is a member of the editorial boards of Russian and international journals: Quantum Electronics, Laser Physics, Applied Physics B: Lasers and Optics, Optical Review, Opto-Electronics Letters).

Awards

In 1998, the scientist received the Order of Friendship of Peoples and the State Prize. In 2004, he was made a Chevalier of the Legion of Honor for his outstanding contribution to scientific cooperation between Russia and France. In 2006, Bagayev was awarded the Order "For Merit to the Fatherland" of the IV degree.

References

Living people

1941 births
Russian physicists
Quantum physicists
Laser researchers
Scientists from Novosibirsk
Novosibirsk State Technical University alumni
Academic staff of Novosibirsk State Technical University
Academic staff of Novosibirsk State University